The Howard County Department of Fire and Rescue Services provides fire protection, rescue, and emergency medical services to Howard County, Maryland.

History
On July 10, 1888, Ellicott City citizens formed The
Volunteer Fire Company of Ellicott City No. 1.  On August 24, 1888, authorization was granted to purchase a hand-drawn ladder wagon from the Charles T. Holloway Company, Baltimore, Maryland. The wagon arrived on October 5, 1888 and was based in the old foundry. The first firehouse built in Ellicott City was constructed in 1896 with a cupola to house a firebell donated by the B&O railroad to summon firemen.

In 1924, the Howard County Volunteer Fireman's Association was formed operating out of a new combination firehouse and transit terminal on Main street in Ellicott City with an $10,500 600 gallon American LaFrance triple combination engine. Insurance agent Benjamin Mellor became the first fire chief serving until 1934. In April 1940, a new fire station was dedicated in Ellicott City.

On 18 April 1959, the Central Alarm went into operation in an office above the Ellicott City Jail.

In 1991, the department implemented a customer service program, more commonly found in the commercial industry. In 1996, Fire Chief Joseph Herr is replaced by Bill Goddard. In 2014 the criteria for contingent firefighters that supplement volunteer stations without benefits changed to require the same qualifications as career staff, promoting the departure of 33 of 34 contingent staff primarily from Lisbon and West Friendship.

Stations & Apparatus 

 

 

There are a total of 13 stations under the umbrella of the department, 5 of which are fully county staffed. The remaining 7 are career/volunteer combination stations. These firehouses are staffed with a combination of both paid personnel and volunteers. The volunteer departments, which are marked below with a V are as follows:
Elkridge Volunteer Fire Department - Station 1
Ellicott City Volunteer Fire Department - Stations 2 & 8
West Friendship Volunteer Fire Department - Station 3
Lisbon Volunteer Fire Company - Station 4
Fifth District Volunteer Fire Department Clarksville - Station 5
Savage Volunteer Fire Department - Station 6

References

External links

Howard County Department of Fire and Rescue
Elkridge Volunteer Fire Department
Ellicott City Volunteer Fire Department
West Friendship Volunteer Fire Department
Lisbon Volunteer Fire Company
Fifth District Volunteer Fire Department, Clarksville
Savage Volunteer Fire Company

Fire departments in Maryland
Howard County, Maryland